Bertrand Bisimwa is a Congolese rebel and human rights activist. He is the president of the March 23 Movement, often abbreviated M23 and also known as the Congolese Revolutionary Army, a rebel military group based in eastern areas of the Democratic Republic of the Congo (DRC). Bisimwa is trained as a lawyer.

M-23 activities 
In the early part of 2013, Bisimwa condemned the United Nation's decision to deploy a special attack force after M23 briefly captured the city of Goma. In November 2013, the armed group was defeated by the Armed Forces of the DRC (FARDC) backed by the United Nations Force Intervention Brigade (FIB). The government forces captured the remaining M23 strongholds. The group declared a ceasefire after a 20-month uprising and Bisimwa announced troop disarmament, demobilization, and reintegration according to terms that he said would be agreed with the government of Congo. He would later claim that his group came under fire after the ceasefire declaration. He also accused the Congolese military of killing suspected M23 members from May 2012 to August 2013. Bisimwa fled to Uganda through the Bunagana border crossing.

Bisimwa is identified as one of the leaders of the new rebel group called M27, which emerged in 2015 and is composed of members of the National Congress for the Defence of the People (CNDP) and M23 defectors.

See also

Jean-Marie Runiga Lugerero

References

Living people
Year of birth missing (living people)
Democratic Republic of the Congo politicians
People of the M23 rebellion
Democratic Republic of the Congo rebels
Democratic Republic of the Congo exiles
21st-century Democratic Republic of the Congo people